Sophia Horner-Sam is a Ghanaian diplomat and politician. She is member of the New Patriotic Party New Patriotic Party of Ghana. She is currently Ghana's ambassador to the Netherlands.

Career
Horner-Sam served as Deputy Western Regional Minister during the John Agyekum Kufour administration.
In July 2017, President Nana Akuffo-Addo appointed her as Ghana's ambassador to the Netherlands.

References

Year of birth missing (living people)
Living people
Ambassadors of Ghana to the Netherlands
New Patriotic Party politicians
Government ministers of Ghana
Women government ministers of Ghana
Ghanaian women ambassadors